The Navya-Nyāya or Neo-Logical darśana (view, system, or school) of Indian logic and Indian philosophy was founded in the 13th century CE by the philosopher Gangeśa Upādhyāya of Mithila and continued by Raghunatha Siromani of Nabadwipa in Bengal.  It was a development of the classical Nyāya darśana. Other influences on Navya-Nyāya were the work of earlier philosophers Vācaspati Miśra (900–980 CE) and Udayana (late 10th century). It remained active in India through to the 18th century.

Gangeśa's book Tattvacintāmaṇi ("Thought-Jewel of Reality") was written partly in response to Śrīharśa's Khandanakhandakhādya, a defence of Advaita Vedānta, which had offered a set of thorough criticisms of Nyāya theories of thought and language.  In his book, Gangeśa both addressed some of those criticisms and – more important – critically examined the Nyāya darśana itself.  He held that, while Śrīharśa had failed to successfully challenge the Nyāya realist ontology, his and Gangeśa's own criticisms brought out a need to improve and refine the logical and linguistic tools of Nyāya thought, to make them more rigorous and precise.

Tattvacintāmani dealt with all the important aspects of Indian philosophy, logic, set theory, and especially epistemology, which Gangeśa examined rigorously, developing and improving the Nyāya scheme, and offering examples.  The results, especially his analysis of cognition, were taken up and used by other darśanas.

Navya-Nyāya developed a sophisticated language and conceptual scheme that allowed it to raise, analyse, and solve problems in logic and epistemology. It systematised all the Nyāya concepts into four main categories which are (sense-) perception (pratyakşa), inference (anumāna), comparison or similarity (upamāna), and testimony (sound or word; śabda). Great stalwarts like Basudev Sarvabhauma, Raghunath Shiromani, Jagadish Tarkalankar, Gadadhar Bhattacharya and Mathuranatha Tarkavagisha have contributed further in the development of the subject. Prof John Vattanky has contributed significantly to the modern understanding of Navya-Nyāya.

See also
 Vaisheshika
 Nyaya
 John Vattanky

Sources and further reading
Bimal Krishna Matilal, The Navya-Nyaya Doctrine of Negation: The Semantics and Ontology of Negative Statements in Navya-Nyaya Philosophy (Harvard University Press, 1968) 
J. N. Mohanty, Classical Indian Philosophy (Rowman & Littlefield, 2000) 
Sarvepalli Radhakrishnan, et al. [edd], History of Philosophy Eastern and Western: Volume One (George Allen & Unwin, 1952)
Vattanky, John, Nyāyapañcānana B. Viśvanātha, Nyāyapañcānana B. Viśvanātha, and Dinakarabhaṭṭa. Nyāya Philosophy of Language: Analysis, Text, Translation and Interpretation of Upamāna and Śabda Sections of Kārikāvalī, Muktāvalī and Dinakarī. (Delhi: Sri Satguru Publications, 1995)
Vattanky, John. A System of Indian Logic: The Nyana Theory of Inference. (London : Routledge, 2015)
Vattanky, John.  Development of Nyāya theism. (New Delhi: Intercultural Publications, 1993)
BHATTACHARYYA, SIBAJIBAN. “GADĀDHARA BHAṬṬĀCĀRYA’S ‘VIṢAYATĀVĀDA.’” Journal of Indian Philosophy 14, no. 2 (1986): 109–93.
BHATTACHARYYA, SIBAJIBAN. “GADĀDHARA BHAṬṬĀCĀRYA’S ‘VIṢAYATĀVĀDA’ (Continued).” Journal of Indian Philosophy 14, no. 3 (1986): 217–302.
Bhattacharyya, Sibajiban. Some Features of Navya-Nyāya Logic. Philosophy East and West 24, no. 3 (1974): 329–42.
Bhattacharyya, Sibajiban. Some Features of the Technical Language of Navya-Nyāya. Philosophy East and West 40, no. 2 (1990): 129–49.

References

Indian philosophy
!